Salperwick is a commune in the Pas-de-Calais department in the Hauts-de-France region of France.

Geography
Salperwick is built on land reclaimed from the marshes, 2 miles (3 km) to the north of Saint-Omer on the D214E1 road.

Population

Places of interest
 The church of Notre-Dame, dating from the sixteenth century.
 The eighteenth-century château. Where Napoleon stayed on August 27 & 28, 1804 after having left Boulogne. The chateau belongs to the family of the count de Guillebon.

See also
 Communes of the Pas-de-Calais department

References

Communes of Pas-de-Calais